Phyllanthus urinaria, commonly called chamber bitter, gripeweed, shatterstone, stonebreaker (but can refer to other Phyllanthus species as well) or leafflower, is a species of suffruticose (woody and perennial at the base with the above being herbaceous) and herb in the family Phyllanthaceae.

Plant description

The plant, reaching around 2 feet, has small alternate leaves resembling those of the genus Mimosa, disposed in two ranges. The leaves are large at the tip and smaller towards the petiole. The leaves are closed at night and are open in the day. Flowers are greenish white, minute and appear at axillae of the leaves, as well as the seed capsules. Numerous small green-red fruits, round and smooth, are found along the underside of the stems, which are erect and red.

This plant is considered a competitive weed in some regions, because of its great number of seeds, its high shade tolerance and its extensive root system.

Distribution
Although of Asian origin, the weed is widely found in all tropical regions of the world. In the United States, it is found in southern states such as Virginia, Florida, Georgia, Alabama, South Carolina, New Mexico, Mississippi, and Texas. It is a warm-season, annual, broadleaf weed that emerges from warm soils beginning in early summer. It reproduces by seeds, which are found in the green, warty-like fruit attached to the underside of the branch

Germination
The plant is a summer annual and germinates from early summer to early fall, requiring warm soil and light.

Subspecies
There are 3 known possible subspecies:

 Phyllanthus urinaria urinaria
 Phyllanthus urinaria nudicarpus (L.) Rossignol & Haicour
 Phyllanthus urinaria hookeri (Müll.Arg.) Hook.f.

Although they seem to not be well accepted taxa.

References

urinaria
Plants described in 1753
Taxa named by Carl Linnaeus